Moscow Society of Naturalists  is one of Russia's oldest learned societies.

In 1805 it was founded as the Imperial Society of Naturalists of Moscow (Société Impériale des Naturalistes de Moscou) under the auspices of two noblemen, Mikhail Muravyov and Alexis Razumovsky, by Johann Fischer von Waldheim in 1805. Princess Zenaǐde Wolkonsky made a gift of her own library to the society. It was organised under the auspices of the Moscow State University (MSU) and included many members of the university staff amongst its members.

The tasks of the society were considered to be the development of general scientific problems of natural science, the study of the natural resources of Russia, including "the discovery of such works, which could constitute a new branch of Russian trade." 

From the very beginning of its existence, the society began organizing expeditions and excursions to study the nature of Russia and collect natural history collections. MOIP organized expeditions to explore Altai, the Urals, the Caucasus, Kamchatka and other regions of Russia. After the study, the materials of the expeditions were transferred to the corresponding museums and offices of Moscow University. Over time, famous travelers, researchers themselves began to send the society materials of their observations, descriptions of trips, as well as exhibits for collections (from Java, Alaska, Malaya, from Persia, Japan, Asia Minor, Brazil, etc.). As a result, most of the collections of the Zoological Museum of Moscow University, as well as University herbariums and mineralogical and paleontological collections of Moscow University, were collected by members of the MOIP.

Such cultural institutions as the Polytechnical Museum and Zoological Museum, founded by MOIP member Professor Anatoli Bogdanov, and University Herbarium founded by MOIP member professor ordinarius Veniaminov P.D. used to be affiliated with the society. It has published its own bimonthly journal, Bulletin de la Société Impériale des Naturalistes de Moscou, since 1826.

It is noteworthy that interest in the problems of aging has been traced in MOIP for 200 years. Many outstanding domestic and foreign scientists and naturalists who made a huge contribution to the development of world gerontology were Full and Honorary Members of MOIP. Among them: August Weismann, Élie Metchnikoff, Rudolf Virchow, Dmitri Mendeleev, Alexander Oparin, Zhores Medvedev, Alexander Bogdanov, Nikolai Koltsov.
In the 1957, the Section of Gerontology in the MOIP was created by specialist in the application of information theory in biology, professor V.V. Alpatov who taught bioinformatics course at MSU Faculty of Biology.   Section members took an active part in the creation of the Russian Gerontological Center (RGC) and  the development of the state programs “Prevention of aging” Since 2018, the section has been headed by a geriatric physician Valery Novoselov. Section Secretary Gaifullin B.N.  The annually published printed collection of works of the members of the section is devoted to the latest achievements of gerontology.

Presidents
Previous presidents include:
 1805—1817 — А. К. Разумовский, 
 1817—1825 — А. П. Оболенский
 1825—1830 — Alexander Pisarev
 1830—1835 — Dmitry Golitsyn
 1835—1847 — Sergei Grigoriyevich Stroganov
 1847—1849 — Д. П. Голохвастов
 1850—1855 — В. И. Назимов
 1856—1859 — Е. П. Ковалевский
 1859—1863 — Н. В. Исаков
 1863—1867 — Д. С. Левшин
 1867—1872 — А. П. Ширинский-Шихматов
 1872—1884 — А. Г. Фишер фон Вальдгейм 
 1884—1886 — К. И. Ренар
 1886—1890 — Fyodor Bredikhin
 1890—1897 — Ф. А. Слудский
 1897—1915 — Н. А. Умов
 1915—1935 — Mikhail Aleksandrovich Menzbier
 1935—1953 — Nikolay Zelinsky
 1955—1967 — Vladimir Sukachev
 1967—1999 — Alexander Yanshin
 2000 on — Viktor Sadovnichiy (MGUs Rector)

References

External links
 Website of the Moscow Society of Naturalists

Scientific societies based in Russia
Moscow State University
1805 establishments in the Russian Empire
Naturalist societies
Organizations established in 1805